Kharachi is a rural locality (a selo) in Untsukulsky District, Republic of Dagestan, Russia. The population was 449 as of 2010.

Geography 
Kharachi is located 17 km west of Shamilkala (the district's administrative centre) by road. Untsukul and Moksokh are the nearest rural localities.

References 

Rural localities in Untsukulsky District